The Real Adventure is a 1922 American silent drama film directed by King Vidor, based on the best-selling novel by Henry Kitchell Webster that was serialized in 1915 and published as a book in 1916. A print of the film is held by the Cinémathèque de Toulous. In February 2020, the film was shown at the 70th Berlin International Film Festival, as part of a retrospective dedicated to King Vidor's career.

Plot
As described in a film magazine, impetuous and headstrong Rose Stanton (Vidor) accidentally meets famous attorney Rodney Aldrich (Fillmore) when a conductor rudely accosts her for her streetcar fare. It is love at first sight and, after a brief courtship, they are married. Rose becomes cross at Rodney while on their honeymoon at his mountain lodge when he studies from a law book for an hour. He saves her after she dashes out into a snow storm. Back home, after her husband ridicules her for attempting to study law, she determines to leave him and, using the name Doris Dane, she becomes famous in New York City as the designer of stage dresses. Her husband follows her to the city and, following a reconciliation, they have a complete understanding. The film ends as a child arrives at the Aldrich residence and the real adventure begins.

Cast
 Florence Vidor as Rose Stanton
 Clyde Fillmore as Rodney Aldrich
 Nellie Peck Saunders as Mrs. Stanton
 Lilyan McCarthy as Portia
 Philip Ryder as John Walbraith

Theme
Film historian John Baxter identifies The Real Adventure (as well as his Woman, Wake Up, also from 1922, as early feminist films: “[Both films] have earned a place in the history of feminist cinema with their picture of a woman struggling to succeed in a male society. In Woman, Wake Up, Florence Vidor  becomes involved in society to please her husband and is so successful at it that he becomes jealous, while in The Real Adventure, she is transformed after her marriage to a wealthy husband: she studies law, goes on stage as a chorus girl, designs costumes, opens a salon but realizes home and family must come first”

Footnotes

References
Baxter, John. 1976. King Vidor. Simon & Schuster, Inc. Monarch Film Studies. LOC Card Number 75-23544.

External links

1920s American films
1920s feminist films
1922 films
1922 drama films
American black-and-white films
American silent feature films
Associated Exhibitors films
Films directed by King Vidor
Silent American drama films
1920s English-language films